Gôh-Djiboua District is one of fourteen administrative districts of Ivory Coast. The district is located in the southwest corner of the country. The capital of the district is Gagnoa.

Creation
Gôh-Djiboua District was created in a 2011 administrative reorganisation of the subdivisions of Ivory Coast. The territory of the district was composed by merging the former regions of Sud-Bandama (except the department of Fresco) and Fromager.

Administrative divisions
Gôh-Djiboua District is currently subdivided into two regions and the following departments:
 Gôh Region (formerly Fromager Region) (region seat also in Gagnoa)
 Gagnoa Department
 Oumé Department
 Lôh-Djiboua Region (formerly Sud-Bandama Region) (region seat in Divo)
 Divo Department
 Lakota Department
 Guitry Department

Population
According to the 2021 census, Gôh-Djiboua District has a population of 2,088,440.

References

 
Districts of Ivory Coast
States and territories established in 2011